Yousuf Goth is one of the neighbourhoods of Gadap Town in Karachi, Sindh, Pakistan. 

There are several ethnic groups in Yousuf Goth all Pakistani. Over 99% of the population is Muslim. The population of Gadap Town is estimated to be nearly one million.

References

External links 
 Karachi Website

Neighbourhoods of Karachi
Gadap Town